ikman.lk is a classified advertisements website operating in Sri Lanka.

Business description
The site hosts user-generated classified advertisements, sorted by various categories. The name "ikman" comes from the Sinhala term "ඉක්මන්" meaning "fast", or "quick".

ikman.lk Launched in June 2012.

ikman.lk became the 6th most visited website in Sri Lanka after three months of operation.

The site is developed and maintained by technical teams based in Sweden, although the business development and customer services for ikman.lk are managed by local staff within Sri Lanka.

The ikman.lk website is considered to be the first classifieds portal in the country to offer content in English as well as the country's main Sinhala and Tamil languages.

References

External links 
 

Online marketplaces of Sri Lanka